Lymphotropha is a genus of parasitic alveolates in the phylum Apicomplexa.

History

This genus was created by Ashford in 1965.

Taxonomy

There is one species in this genus.

Life cycle

This genus infects the flour beetle Tribolium castaneum.

The sporozoites enter the host by the oral route, usually by ingestion of contaminated food but also by cannibalism of an infected host.

Infection with this genus increases larval mortality and interferes with normal development.

References

Apicomplexa genera